The 2006 Propecia Rally New Zealand was the penultimate round of the 2006 World Rally Championship season. It took place between 17 and 19 November 2006.

Marcus Grönholm won and teammate Mikko Hirvonen placed second, sealed the Ford's first manufacturers’ world title since .

Results 

Source:

Special Stages
All dates and times are NZDT (UTC+13).

Notes 
 Seven time MotoGP champion Valentino Rossi competed in his first rally since 2002 Rally GB.

References

External links
 Results at eWRC.com
 Results at Jonkka's World Rally Archive

Rally New Zealand, 2006
New Zealand
Rally New Zealand